Urania Genève Sport is a professional basketball club, section of the eponymous UGS multi-sports club, based in Geneva, Switzerland.

History
The basketball section of UGS was founded in 1930  and became one of the powerhouses in the Swiss League having won 15 champion titles.

Honour & achievements
Swiss League
 Winners (15): 1937-38, 1938–39, 1941–42, 1942–43, 1943–44, 1944–45, 1946–47, 1947–48, 1948–49, 1949–50, 1558–59, 1959–60, 1964–65, 1965–66, 1967–68
Swiss Cup
 Winners (3): 1941-42, 1959–60, 1960–61

References

Basketball teams in Switzerland
Sport in Geneva
1930 establishments in Switzerland